The 2008 Colgate Raiders football team was an American football team that represented Colgate University during the 2008 NCAA Division I FCS football season. Colgate won the Patriot League championship, but lost in the first round of the national FCS playoffs. 

In its 13th season under head coach Dick Biddle, the team compiled a 9–3 record (9–2 regular season). Jordan Scott, Nick Hennessey and Alex Relph were the team captains. 

The Raiders outscored opponents 363 to 349. Their undefeated (5–0) conference record topped the seven-team Patriot League standings. Colgate played only five Patriot League games because its October 4 matchup with Georgetown was canceled following a norovirus outbreak at Georgetown.

Colgate began the year unranked and did not enter the national top 25 until November. They were ranked No. 24 before their matchup with Lehigh, No. 21 before the season-ender against Holy Cross, and No. 16 entering the playoffs. Following their first-round exit from the playoffs, the Raiders kept their No. 16 rank in the year's final poll.

The team played its home games at Andy Kerr Stadium in Hamilton, New York.

Schedule

References

Patriot League football champion seasons
Colgate
Colgate Raiders football seasons
Colgate Raiders football